Erromintxela is the distinctive language of a group of Romani living in the Basque Country, who also go by the name Erromintxela. Although detailed accounts of the language date to the end of the 19th century, linguistic research began only in the 1990s.

The Erromintxela are the descendants of a 15th-century wave of Kalderash Roma, who entered the Basque Country via France. Both ethnically and linguistically, they are distinct from the Caló-speaking Romani people in Spain and the Cascarot Romani people of the Northern Basque Country. Erromintxela is a mixed language (referred to as Para-Romani in Romani linguistics), deriving most of its vocabulary from Kalderash Romani but using Basque grammar, similar to the way the Angloromani language of the Roma in England mixes Romani vocabulary and English grammar. The development of the mixed language was facilitated by the unusually-deep integration of the Erromintxela people into Basque society and the resultant bilingualism in Basque. The language is in decline; most of the perhaps 1000 remaining speakers live on the coast of Labourd and in the mountainous regions of Soule, Navarre, Gipuzkoa and Biscay.

Name

The origin of the name Erromintxela is unclear and may be of relatively recent origin; Basque speakers had previously grouped the Erromintxela under more general terms for Romani such as ijitoak "Egyptians", ungrianok "Hungarians", or buhameak "Bohemians". However, a number of authors believe it to be a Basque rendering of the French name romanichel or romané-michel, a name attested primarily in the vicinity of the Pyrenees and in particular the Northern Basque Country. Romanichel is in turn a French rendering of the Romani phrase Romani čel "Romani person". Though now uncommon in France, it is found in the names of the British Ròmanichal and the Scandinavian Romanisæl, all descendants, like the Erromintxela, of a group of Roma who had migrated to France.

Early attestations of the name in Basque include Errama-itçéla, Erroumancel, later errumanzel and erremaitzela. The initial e- is the Basque prosthetic vowel, which was added at a time that no Basque word was allowed to begin with an r-. The final -a is the absolutive case suffix, which is used when citing a name. If that etymology is correct, it is a rare case of a native Romani name for themselves (an endonym) being borrowed by another language.

The people identify themselves as ijitoak, Basque for "gypsies", but more specifically as Erromintxela, in contrast to the Caló Romani, whom they refer to as the xango-gorriak, Basque for "red-legs".

State of the language
There are currently an estimated 500 speakers in the Southern Basque Country in Spain, approximately 2% of a population of 21,000 Romanis, and another estimated 500 in France. In Spain the remaining fluent speakers are elderly people mostly over the age of 80; some are equally fluent in Spanish, Basque, or Caló. Middle-aged Erromintxela are mostly passive bilinguals, and the youngest speak only Basque or Spanish. In the Northern Basque Country, however, the language is still being passed on to children. The percentage of speakers among Spanish Erromintxela are higher than 2%, as large numbers of Caló-speaking Romanis moved to the Basque Country in the intense period of industrialisation in the 20th century.

Literary production
To date, there has been little literary production in the language. The most notable works are a poem by Jon Mirande entitled "Kama-goli" in his 1997 anthology Orhoituz and the 1999 novel Agirre zaharraren kartzelaldi berriak by Koldo Izagirre Urreaga with the main character using the language.

History
The Erromintxela arrived in the Basque Country in the 15th century speaking Kalderash Romani. They integrated much more deeply into Basque society than other Romani groups. In the process, they acquired the Basque language and adopted aspects of Basque culture such as increased rights of women and important traditions such as bertsolaritza (extemporaneous poetic song) and pelota (the national Basque ballgame). Muñoz and Lopez de Mungia suspect that the morphological and phonological similarities between Romani and Basque facilitated the adoption of Basque grammar by the bilingual Romanis.

It appears that many Romanis chose to stay in the Basque Country to escape persecution elsewhere in Europe. Nonetheless, even here they were not safe from persecution. For example, the Royal Council of Navarre in 1602 passed an edict to round up all "vagabonds" (meaning Romani), who were to be condemned to 6 years of galley duty. By the 18th century however attitudes had changed, and the emphasis shifted towards integration. In 1780–1781 the Courts of Navarre passed Law 23, which called for "the authorities to take care of them, find them locations for settlement and honest occupations and ways of living..."

Research
The oldest account of the language dates to 1855, when the French ethnographer Justin Cenac-Moncaut located the Erromintxela primarily in the Northern Basque Country. The oldest coherent Erromintxela text, a poem entitled Kama-goli, published by Basque writer Jon Mirande in a collection of Basque poetry, only dates to ca. 1960.

Alexandre Baudrimont's 40-page study Vocabulaire de la langue des Bohémiens habitant les pays basques français of 1862, the most extensive of the early accounts, covers both vocabulary and aspects of grammar. He worked with two female informants, a mother and her daughter from the Uhart-Mixe area near Saint-Palais, whom he describes as highly fluent. Unfortunately, he was only able to conduct a single session as the women were then told not to cooperate further for the fear of outsiders prying into the secrets of the Romani. There is a certain degree of confusion in Baudrimont's publication—he himself states that he could not always be certain the correct forms were elicited. For example, most of the verb forms he tried to elicit lack the verbal -tu ending and appear to be participles.

The French sociologist Victor de Rochas refers to the Romani in the Northern Basque Country speaking Basque, rather than French, in his 1876 Les Parias de France et d'Espagne (cagots et bohémiens). The Canon Jean-Baptiste Daranatz published a wordlist in the periodical Eskualdun Ona in 1906 and in 1921 Berraondo and Oyarbide carried out some research. Although labelled gitano (Spanish for 'gypsy') or bohémien / gitan (French for 'gypsy'), some data can also be found in Azkue's 1905 dictionary and Pierre Lhande's 1926 dictionary, both of which list a number of words identifiable as Erromintxela.

Little more was done until the late 20th century. In 1986 Federico Krutwig published a short article in the Revista Internacional de Estudios Vascos entitled "Los gitanos vascos", with a short word list and a brief analysis of the language's morphology. However, the most detailed research to date was carried out by Basque philologist Josune Muñoz and historian Elias Lopez de Mungia, who began their work in the Southern Basque Country in 1996 at the behest of the Romani organisation Kalé Dor Kayiko, with support from the Euskaltzaindia and the University of the Basque Country. Kalé Dor Kayiko, who had been working to promote the Romani language, was alerted to the existence of Erromintxela in the 1990s through an article by the historian Alizia Stürtze, Agotak, juduak eta ijitoak Euskal Herrian "Agotes, Jews, and Gypsies in the Basque Country". Kalé Dor Kayiko intends to continue research into the language, attitudes, identity, and history of the Erromintxela people in the less well researched provinces of Navarre and the Northern Basque Country.

Linguistic features
The research by Muñoz and Lopez de Mungia has confirmed that Erromintxela is not derived from Caló, the mixed Spanish-Romani language spoken throughout Spain, but is instead based on Kalderash Romani and the Basque language. The vocabulary appears to be almost exclusively Romani in origin; the grammar however, both morphology and syntax, derives from various Basque dialects. Few traces appear to remain of Romani grammatical structures. The language is incomprehensible to speakers of both Basque and of Caló.

Typologically, Erromintxela displays the same features as the Basque dialects it derives its grammatical structures from. Its case marking follows the ergative–absolutive pattern where the subject of an intransitive verb is in the absolutive case (which is unmarked), the same case being used for the direct object of a transitive verb. The subject of a transitive verb is marked with the ergative case. Similarly, auxiliary verbs agree with the subject and any direct object and indirect object present and verb forms are marked for allocutive (i.e. a marker is used to indicate the gender of the addressee).

Since both Erromintxela and Caló derive from Romani, many Erromintxela words are similar to Spanish Caló and Catalan Caló.

Phonology
According to Baudrimont's description of 1862 and modern southern sources, Erromintxela appears to have, at maximum, the sound system below.

Baudrimont uses a semi-phonetic system with the following diverging conventions:

Morphology
Examples of morphological features in Erromintxela:

Verb formation
Most verbs have a Romani root plus the Basque verb forming suffix -tu. Examples of Erromintxela verbs are given below. (Forms given in angle brackets indicate spellings in the sources which are no longer in use. Basque is included for comparison.)

Most Erromintxela verbal inflections are virtually identical to those found in Basque dialects:

Negations are formed with na/nagi (Romani na/níči); cf Basque ez/ezetz. The word for "yes" is ua (Romani va); cf Basque bai/baietz.

Nouns
The majority of nouns have Romani roots, but frequently attested with Basque suffixes. The variation of nouns cited with or without a final -a is likely due to informants supplying them with or without the absolutive ending. (Forms given in angle brackets indicate spellings in the sources which are no longer in use.)

Time
According to Baudrimot, the Erromintxela have adopted the Basque names of the months. Note that some of the Basque names represent pre-standardisation names of the months, e.g. August is Abuztua in Standard Basque rather than Agorrila.

Baudrimont claims that subdivisions of the year (apart from the months) are formed with the word breja (bréχa) "year": breja kinua "month" and breja kipia "week".

Numerals
Numerals (Basque included for contrasting purposes):

Adjectives and adverbs
Adjectives and adverbs are also mostly derived from Romani forms:

Pronouns & demonstratives
Pronouns are derived from both languages:

Baudrimont's material
Much of Baudrimont's wordlist is easily related to other Erromintxela sources. However, some of the material collected by Baudrimont deserves a more detailed overview due to its peculiarities. Most of these relate to the verbs and verb forms he collected but some include nouns and other items.

Nouns
His material contains a relatively high number of Basque-derived items.

Certain items are peculiar. Baudrimont lists mintxa as "tooth". The Kalderash term is dand (daní in Caló) but the term given is immediately more reminiscent of Northern Basque mintzo "speech" or mintza "skin" (with expressive palatalization). This, and other similar items, raise the question of whether Baudrimont was simply pointing at items to elicit forms.

The forms he attempted to elicit are questionable in some cases as well. For example, he attempted to agricultural terms such as plough, harrow and aftermath from his (female) informants and records the suspiciously similar sasta "plough" and xatxa (shatsha) "harrow".

Verb system and pronouns
The verb systems and pronouns recorded by Baudrimont is peculiar in several ways. Apart from his problem of eliciting the citation form of verbs as opposed to participles, he lists pronouns and possessive pronouns that appear to contain Romani roots and an unexpected auxiliary.

The verb ajin for "to have" attested elsewhere although Basque derived forms appear more common overall. Kalderash Romani employs the 3rd person of "to be" and a dative pronoun to express ownership:

1Note that forms like duk (3rd pers-have-2nd per (male)) are the verbal part whereas Erromintxela tuk is a pronoun.

The negative particle na is fairly clear in the forms above. Buter, as Baudrimont notes, is the word for "much, many" and may not be a true pronoun. Kalderash uses the accusative pronouns to express possession but the forms above are more reminiscent of wrongly parsed Kalderash dative forms mangé, tuké, léske, léke etc. and perhaps a different case of "to be" (the full Kalderash paradigm being sim, san, si, si, sam, san/sen, si).

On the whole, it raises questions about the level of communication between Baudrimont and his informants and the quality of (some of the) material elicited.

Connected examples
Examples with interlinear versions (lexical items of Romani origin marked in bold):

Bibliography
 Baudrimont, A. (1862) Vocabulaire de la langue des Bohémiens habitant les Pays Basque Français Academie Impérial des Sciences, Bordeaux
 Berraondo, R. (1921) La euskera de los gitanos in Euskalerriaren Alde - Revista de Cultura Vasca
 Macritchie, D. (1886) Accounts Of The Gypsies Of India New Society Publications, New Delhi; 2007 Reprint 
 Michel, F. (1857) Le Pays Basque Paris

Notes

External links
Kalé Dor Kayiko
Full version of the Erromintxela poem with Basque translation
Gitano in the Spanish-language Auñamendia Encyclopedia.

Languages of Spain
Languages of France
Para-Romani
Basque language
Mixed languages
Romani in France
Romani in Spain